The 1946–1947 season was Burnley's tenth consecutive season in the second tier of English football. Under recently appointed manager Cliff Britton they achieved promotion to the First Division, and reached the FA Cup Final for only the second time, where they were runners-up to Charlton Athletic.

Appearances and goals

|}

Matches

Football League Division Two
Key

In Result column, Burnley's score shown first
H = Home match
A = Away match

pen. = Penalty kick
o.g. = Own goal

Results

Final league position

FA Cup

References

Burnley F.C. seasons
Burnley